

Clubs

Results

League table

Top scorers

B